Colobanthus kerguelensis is a low-growing, moss-like flowering cushion plant in the family Caryophyllaceae, found on subantarctic islands in the southern Indian Ocean.  The specific epithet refers to the type locality – the Kerguelen Islands.

Description
Colobanthus kerguelensis  is a perennial herb that forms loose clumps or cushions up to 65 mm in diameter.  The slender, freely branching stems lack adventitious roots.  The leaves are linear and fleshy, 5–10 mm long and 2–3.5 mm wide. The flowers are 4-merous, with two large outer sepals, and two smaller inner ones.  The plant flowers from December to March, and fruits from March.

Distribution and habitat
As well as on Kerguelen, Colobanthus kerguelensis occurs on the Crozet, Prince Edward, and Heard Islands.  It has been recorded from gravel substrates in the supralittoral or sea spray zone, in well-drained peaty and sandy soils with Azorella selago, and in feldmark, up to elevations of 30 m above sea level.  It is a pioneer coloniser of recently deglaciated areas.

References

Notes

Sources
 
 
 

kerguelensis
Flora of the Crozet Islands
Flora of the Kerguelen Islands
Flora of the Prince Edward Islands
Flora of Heard Island and McDonald Islands
Plants described in 1845
Taxa named by Joseph Dalton Hooker